Kiss the Bride may refer to:

"Kiss the Bride" (song), a 1983 single by Elton John from the album Too Low for Zero
Kiss the Bride (2002), novel by Patricia Cabot
Kiss the Bride (2002 film), directed by Vanessa Parise
Kiss the Bride (2007 film), directed by C. Jay Cox, starring Tori Spelling and others